"Mr. Blue Sky" is a song by the Electric Light Orchestra (ELO), featured on the band's seventh studio album Out of the Blue (1977). Written and produced by frontman Jeff Lynne, the song forms the fourth and final track of the "Concerto for a Rainy Day" suite, on side three of the original double album. "Mr. Blue Sky" was the second single to be taken from Out of the Blue, peaking at number 6 in the UK Singles Chart and number 35 in the US Billboard Charts.

Like the album from which the single was issued, promotional copies were released on blue vinyl. Due to its popularity and frequent use in multiple television shows and movies, it has sometimes been described as the band's  signature song.

Inspiration
In a BBC Radio interview, Lynne talked about writing "Mr. Blue Sky" after locking himself away in a Swiss chalet and attempting to write ELO's follow-up to A New World Record:

The song's arrangement has been called "Beatlesque", bearing similarities to Beatles songs "Martha My Dear" and "A Day in the Life" while harmonically it shares its unusual first four chords and harmonic rhythm with "Yesterday". The song's piano and drum intro is borrowed from the Kinks' 1968 song "Do You Remember Walter".

Arrangement

The arrangement makes prominent use of a cowbell-like sound, which is credited on the album, to percussionist Bev Bevan, as that of a "fire extinguisher". When the song is performed live, a drumstick is used to strike the side of a fire extinguisher, which produces the sound.

Describing the song for the BBC, Dominic King said:
Lots of Gibb Brothers' vocal inflexions and Beatles' arrangement quotes (Penny Lane bell, Pepper panting, Abbey Road arpeggio guitars). But this fabulous madness creates its own wonder – the bendy guitar solo, funky cello stop-chorus, and the most freakatastic vocoder since Sparky's Magic Piano. Plus the musical ambush on "way" at 2.51 still thrills. And that's before the Swingle Singers/RKO Tarzan movie/Rachmaninoff symphonic finale gets underway. Kitsch, yet truly exhilarating.

The song features a heavily vocoded voice singing the phrase "Mr. Blue Sky". A second vocoded segment at the end of the song was often interpreted by listeners as "Mr. Blue Sky"; it is actually "Please turn me over" as it is the end of side three, and the listener is being instructed to flip the LP over. This was confirmed by Jeff Lynne on 3 October 2012 on The One Show.

Critical reception 
AllMusic's Donald A. Guarisco considered "Mr. Blue Sky" a "miniature pop symphony" and a "multi-layered pop treat that was a pure Beatles pastiche", saying that "the music divides its time between verses that repeat the same two notes to hypnotic effect a la 'I Am the Walrus' and an effervescent, constantly-ascending chorus". Guarisco also pointed out other references to the Beatles such as "the staccato bassline [recalling] the chorus of 'Hello Goodbye' and pounding piano lines and panting background vocals [recalling] the midsection of 'A Day in the Life.  Billboard described the beat as "catchy" and said that the song builds from a "thumping intro" to a "harmonic operatic" ending.  Cash Box said that the song "features a characteristically full sound and effective use of breaks" and that "fast pace, airy singing and strings provide musical dramatics."  Record World said that "this up-tempo tune guarantees Lynne's legend as both writer and producer and shows off ELO's unique sound."  Ultimate Classic Rock critic Michael Gallucci rated it as ELO's best song.

In popular culture 

The song has been used in the films Role Models, The Magic Roundabout (or Doogal in the USA),  Wild Mussels, Eternal Sunshine of the Spotless Mind, Paul Blart: Mall Cop, The Game Plan, Martian Child, The Invention of Lying, Megamind, and   Guardians of the Galaxy Vol. 2.

The song was the popular choice to be the theme song for the NBC television show, The Office.  However, it had already been chosen to be the theme for another show on the network, LAX, that premiered the year before in 2004. The song was also used in the British television show Doctor Who. It was also featured during the opening and closing ceremonies of the 2012 Summer Olympics, the awards ceremony following the 2011 Football League Cup Final, and the closing ceremony of the 2018 Commonwealth Games from the Gold Coast, in a promotion for the 2022 Games, which was held in Birmingham - with the track used to celebrate ELO originating from the city. The song played as "completely different" characters and props, which included flying bicycles and a giant cannon populated the stage and set the mood for Monty Python's Eric Idle and his musical appearance during the Closing Ceremony of the London Olympics in 2012.

The song was also featured in Just Dance 2022, albeit covered by The Sunlight Shakers. 

On October 23, 2021, Dr. Teeth and the Electric Mayhem of The Muppets released their cover for the Dear Earth special by YouTube and Google.

Personnel 
 Jeff Lynne – lead & backing vocals, lead & rhythm guitars, orchestral & choral arrangements
 Bev Bevan – drums, various percussion instruments, cymbals, backing vocals, fire extinguisher
 Richard Tandy – piano, electric piano, synthesizer, vocoder, orchestral & choral arrangements
 Kelly Groucutt – bass guitar, backing vocals
 Mik Kaminski – violin
 Hugh McDowell – cello
 Melvyn Gale – cello

Additional personnel
 Louis Clark – orchestral & choral arrangements, orchestra conductor

Charts

Weekly charts

Year-end charts

Certifications

Jeff Lynne version

Jeff Lynne re-recorded the song and other ELO tracks in his own home studio in 2012. The resulting album, Mr. Blue Sky: The Very Best of Electric Light Orchestra, was released under the ELO name. A difference that this version has is that it doesn't include the ending orchestral piece. An earlier version of the song with different vocal takes was heard on the 2010 film, Megamind.

Music video
A music video was released in late 2012 via the official ELO website and YouTube, a colourful animation directed by Michael Patterson and Candace Reckinger with animation sequences designed and animated by University of Southern California students.

Personnel 

 Jeff Lynne - vocals, guitar, piano, bass, drums, keyboards, vocoder
 Rosie Vela - backing vocals
 Marc Mann - strings
 Steve Jay - shakers, tambourine

Other recordings 
 Mr. Blue Sky - Nerf Herder (1998)
 Mr. Blue Sky - Lily Allen (2006)
 Mr. Blue Sky - Connie Talbot (2014)
 Mr. Blue Sky - Weezer (2019)
 Mr. Blue Sky - Pomplamoose (2019)

References

External links
In-depth Song Analysis at the Jeff Lynne Song Database (Jefflynnesongs.com)

"Mr. Blue Sky" song review at Allmusic

1978 singles
Electric Light Orchestra songs
Song recordings produced by Jeff Lynne
Songs written by Jeff Lynne
Jet Records singles
1977 songs
Progressive pop songs
Weezer songs
The Muppets songs